Daniel Louis (born October 12, 1953) is a Canadian film producer. He is co-founder, with Denise Robert, of Cinémaginaire.

He has earned two Genie Awards, among other nominations, including the Genie Award for Best Motion Picture for The Barbarian Invasions (shared with Robert and Fabienne Vonier) and a Golden Reel Award for Wedding Night (Nuit de noces) (shared with Robert).

External links 
 

1953 births
Film producers from Quebec
Canadian Screen Award winners
People from Montreal
Living people
Canadian film production company founders